County Wexford was a UK Parliament constituency in Ireland, which returned two Members of Parliament (MPs) to the United Kingdom House of Commons.

Boundaries
This constituency comprised the whole of County Wexford, except for the parliamentary boroughs of New Ross and Wexford Borough.

Members of Parliament

Elections

Elections in the 1830s

 
 
 
 

 

 

 
 
 
 
 

Chichester was elevated to the peerage, becoming 1st Baron Templemore and causing a by-election.

 

 
 
 
 
 
 
 

Carew was elevated to the peerage, becoming 1st Baron Carew and causing a by-election.

Elections in the 1840s

Elections in the 1850s

Elections in the 1860s

 
 
 

George resigned after being appointed judge of the Queen's Bench Division.

Elections in the 1870s

Elections in the 1880s

 

Byrne resigned, causing a by-election.

References

The Parliaments of England by Henry Stooks Smith (1st edition published in three volumes 1844–50), 2nd edition edited (in one volume) by F.W.S. Craig (Political Reference Publications 1973)

Westminster constituencies in County Wexford (historic)
Constituencies of the Parliament of the United Kingdom established in 1801
Constituencies of the Parliament of the United Kingdom disestablished in 1885